Thyago Vieira Lucio (born 1 July 1993) is a Brazilian professional baseball pitcher in the Milwaukee Brewers organization. He has played in Major League Baseball (MLB) for the Seattle Mariners and Chicago White Sox and in Nippon Professional Baseball (NPB) for the Yomiuri Giants.

Career

Seattle Mariners
On 20 November 2010, Vieira signed with the Seattle Mariners organization as an international free agent. He made his professional debut with the Venezuelan Summer League (VSL) Mariners, pitching to a 4.00 earned run average (ERA) in 12 games. He returned to the VSL Mariners the next year, logging a 3–5 win–loss record and 6.05 ERA in 55 innings of work. In 2013, Vieira played for the Low-A Everett AquaSox, pitching to a 4–5 record and 3.84 ERA with 51 strikeouts in 68 innings of work. In 2014, Vieira played for the Single-A Clinton LumberKings, recording a 1–1 record and 5.23 ERA in 13 games. He returned to Clinton for the 2015 season, and accrued a 1–4 record and 6.97 ERA in 22 appearances for the team. After an extended spring training in 2016, he joined the High-A Bakersfield Blaze as a reliever, where he worked extensively with pitching coach Ethan Katz. On the year, he registered a 2.84 ERA with 53 strikeouts in  innings pitched.

The Mariners added Vieira to their 40-man roster after the 2016 season. He began the 2017 season with the Double-A Arkansas Travelers, and also played for the Triple-A Tacoma Rainiers, logging a 4.00 ERA in 41 appearances between the two clubs. Vieira was promoted to the major leagues for the first time on 14 August 2017, and pitched one shutout inning against the Baltimore Orioles before being optioned to Triple-A the next day.

Chicago White Sox
On 16 November 2017, Vieira was traded to the Chicago White Sox in exchange for international bonus pool money. He was assigned to the Triple-A Charlotte Knights to begin the 2018 season, where he logged a 5.05 ERA in 36 games. In 16 games for Chicago, Vieira pitched to a 7.13 ERA with 15 strikeouts in 16 appearances. In 2019, he struggled to a 9.00 ERA in six big league games, but recorded a better 6–4 record and 5.70 ERA in 39 games for Triple-A Charlotte. Vieira was released on 2 December 2019, in order to allow him to pursue an opportunity in Japan.

Yomiuri Giants
On 3 December 2019, Vieira signed with the Yomiuri Giants of Nippon Professional Baseball (NPB). In his first NPB season, Vieira had a 3.28 ERA with 29 strikeouts in  innings of work.

On 1 September 2021, he set a NPB record for most consecutive mound appearances without giving up a run (32) by a non-Japanese player, breaking a record previously set in 2011 by Brian Falkenborg of the Fukuoka SoftBank Hawks. In 2021, he recorded seven saves and had a 2.76 ERA in  innings with 38 strikeouts and was selected to the Nippon League All Star Game. On 23 December 2021, Vieira re-signed with the Giants for the 2022 season.

On 7 April 2022, following a game in which he had hit Hiroshima Toyo Carp batter Ryan McBroom in the head, Vieira was sent down to Yomiuri's farm team. He had struggled to a 22.50 ERA in 4 appearances at the point of his demotion.

Milwaukee Brewers
On 12 January 2023, Vieira signed a minor league contract with the Milwaukee Brewers organization.

International career
He was selected for Brazil national baseball team at the 2013 World Baseball Classic Qualification, 2013 World Baseball Classic, 2017 World Baseball Classic Qualification, and 2019 Pan American Games Qualifier.

References

External links

1993 births
Living people
Arkansas Travelers players
Bakersfield Blaze players
Brazilian expatriate baseball players in Japan
Brazilian expatriate baseball players in the United States
Charlotte Knights players
Chicago White Sox players
Clinton LumberKings players
Everett AquaSox players
Major League Baseball pitchers
Major League Baseball players from Brazil
Nippon Professional Baseball pitchers
Peoria Javelinas players
Seattle Mariners players
Sportspeople from São Paulo
Tacoma Rainiers players
Venezuelan Summer League Mariners players
Yomiuri Giants players
2013 World Baseball Classic players
Brazilian expatriate baseball players in Venezuela